The following is a list of contract killers (also referred to hitman), both current and former. Contract killing is defined as the unlawful assassination murder of a targeted party.

Australia
Keith Faure
Christopher Dale Flannery
Evangelos Goussis
Lindsey Robert Rose

Brazil
Maia "Mainha" Cunha
Julio Santana

Canada
Dean Michael Wiwchar
Richard Blass
Bal Buttar
Salvatore Calautti
David Carroll
Gerald Gallant
Dean Daniel Kelsie
Cecil Kirby
Donald Lavoie
Jackie McLaughlin
Serge Quesnel
Aimé Simard
Réal Simard
Yves Trudeau

China
Xi Guangan
Ling Xiansi

Colombia
Andrés Leonardo Achipiz
Jorge Ayala
Dandeny Muñoz Mosquera
Jhon Jairo Velásquez

Croatia
Sretko Kalinić

Czech Republic
Jiří Kájínek

Denmark
Jim-Bo Poulsen

England
John Childs
Mark Fellows
Jimmy Moody

India 
Noor "Noora" Baksh
Jaggu Pehelwan
Shri Prakash Shukla

Finland
Janne Raninen

Germany
Werner Pinzner ″St.-Pauli-Killer″

Ireland
James Quinn

Italy
Maurizio Avola
Amerigo Dumini
Giuseppe Greco

Japan
Toshio Maruyama

Jamaica
Christopher Anthony Lee

Mexico
Gregorio Sauceda-Gamboa
José Rodrigo Aréchiga Gamboa
José Manuel Martínez
Joselyn Alejandra Niño
Héctor Luis Palma Salazar
Marciano Millan Vasquez

New Zealand
Diego Carbone
Jeremy Powell

Philippines
Edgar Matobato

Russia
Igor the Assassin
Maxim Lazovsky
Alexander Pustovalov
Oleg Smorodinov
Alexander Solonik
Andrey Vershinin
Alexei Sherstobitov

Scotland
Billy 'Buff' Paterson

Serbia
Sretko Kalinić

Singapore
 Anthony Ler
 Muhammad Nasir Abdul Aziz

Slovakia
Jozef Roháč

Turkey
Abdullah Çatlı
Mahmut Yıldırım

United States
Charles Harrelson
Joe Adonis
William Aloisio
Willie "Two-Knife" Altieri
Joseph Barboza
Gakirah Barnes
Fiore Buccieri
Fred Burke
Anthony Capo
Frank M. Canton
Charles Carrollo
Jackie Cerone
Pasquale Conte
Roy DeMeo
Richard DiNome
Glennon Engleman
Ray Ferritto
Stephen Flemmi
Vincent Flemmi
Jimmy Fratianno
Carmine Galante
Vito Genovese
Jason Getsy
Sam Giancana
Fred Goetz
Martin Goldstein
Sammy Gravano
Tom Horn
Cornelius Hughes
Stevie Hughes
John Kelley
Richard Kuklinski
Mad Dog Coll
Maurice Lerner
Johnny Martorano
Robert Mormando
Donald Nash
Ross Prio
David "Chippy" Robinson
Frank Salemme
Gregory Scarpa
Frank Schweihs
Frank Sheeran
Shotgun Man
Thomas Sinito
Joseph "Mad Dog" Sullivan
Salvatore Testa
Stephen Wayne Anderson
Umberto Valenti
Jack Whalen
Gus Winkler

References 

 
Lists of people by activity